Danavulapadu Jain temple is an ancient Jain center located in Danavulapadu village of Kadapa district in the state of Andhra Pradesh.

History 
Danavulapadu Jain temple, discovered in 1903, was once an important Jain center and received royal patronage from Rashtrakuta dynasty. According to inscriptions on Nishidhi stone, the site was popular among Jain acharyas to perform Sallekhana. A 13th century inscription found in neighbouring village mentions present of this temple.

A chaumukha (four-faced) idol was installed in 8th century during reign of Rashtrakuta dynasty. There is a one-line sanskrit inscription  at the base of the statue with characters from the early Eastern Chalukyas period. In 968 CE, Khottiga, Rashtrakuta empire, installed a panavatta for the Mahamastakabhisheka of Shantinatha.

About temple 

The temple plan features a mandapa, antarala, and garbhagriha. The adhishtana of the temple is decorated with fine carvings. There are carvings of Nāga, Nāginī, Hanuman and Ganesha on temple wall.

The temple enshrines a 10th-century  idol of a five-hooded serpent Parshvanatha seated on a lotus shaped pedestal with carvings scroll ornaments and sculptures of elephants and crocodiles as vahanas. The hands, and portion nelow the knee is broken. There is an image of yakshi in lotus position seated on a lion. The second shrine is heavily ornate structure enshring an idol of Tirthankara. Several serpent deities idols have been placed besides the well near the temple complex. The temple also houses an idol of Padmavati.

Gallery

Conservation 
The temple complex is protected by Archaeological Survey of India. Various artefacts, inscriptions and sculptures discovered at the site are now placed inside Government Museum, Chennai.

See also 
 Ramateertham
 Ambapuram cave temple

Notes

References

Citation

Sources

Books

Web

External links

Jain temples in Andhra Pradesh
8th-century Jain temples